The Nesselsdorf type C is a veteran automobile manufactured by Nesselsdorfer Wagenbau-Fabriks-Gesellschaft A.G. (NW, now known as Tatra) in 1902. Only two cars of the design were made, while the production of NW B was still running (1901–1904).

The car was able to reach speed of 90 km/h.

References

Cars of the Czech Republic
Tatra vehicles
Cars introduced in 1902
Rear mid-engine, rear-wheel-drive vehicles